Pelagerythrobacter marinus is a bacterium from the genus Pelagerythrobacter which has been isolated from deep seawater from the Indian Ocean.

References

External links
Type strain of Altererythrobacter marinus at BacDive -  the Bacterial Diversity Metadatabase

Sphingomonadales
Bacteria described in 2009